Alexander Antonovich Gertsyk (1857  31 January 1916) was a Russian commander, Lieutenant General, Chief of the 1st Guards Infantry Division, participant in the Russo-Turkish War and World War I.

Biography
Born to a family of a military engineer, Major General Anton Kazimirovich Gertsyk. In 1875, after graduating from the St. Petersburg Military Grammar School, he entered the 2nd Military Konstantinovsky School.

In 1877, after graduating from a military school, he was promoted to ensign and assigned to the 16th separate rifle battalion. Member of the Russian-Turkish war. For bravery in the war, he was awarded the Order of St. Anne of 4 degrees with the inscription "For courage." For the difference, he was promoted to second lieutenant.

In 1879, he was awarded the Order of St. Stanislav of the 3rd degree with swords and a bow and St. Anne of the 3rd degree with swords and a bow for courage.

In 1882, he was promoted to lieutenant, and in 1884, he became captains of staff. In 1887, he was appointed junior officer at the Pavlovsk Military School. In 1889, he was promoted to captain, in the same year he was renamed the staff captain of the guard, in 1892 to captain of the guard. In 1898, he was promoted to lieutenant colonel and appointed battalion commander of the Pavlovsk Military School. In 1898 he was promoted to colonel.

In 1902, he was appointed commander of the 52nd Infantry Regiment of Vilna. Since 1906, the commander of the Life Guards Pavlovsky Regiment. In 1906, Major Generals were promoted for honors.

Since 1908, the commander of the 2nd Brigade of the 1st Guards Infantry Division. Since 1914, the commander of the 80th Infantry Division.

Before the Great War, he was chairman of the commission for the development of automatic rifles.

In 1915, he was promoted to lieutenant general and appointed commander of the 1st Guards Infantry Division, in the same year “For Distinction in Affairs Against the Enemy” he was awarded the Order of St. Anna of the 1st degree with swords.

He died on 31 January 1916.

Awards
Order of St. Anna of the 4th degree with the inscription "For Courage" (1877);
Order of Saint Stanislaus (House of Romanov), 3rd degree with swords and bow (1879);
Order of St. Anna of the 3rd degree with swords and bow (1879);
Order of St. Vladimir 4th degree (1886).
Order of Saint Stanislaus (House of Romanov), 2nd degree (1890);
Order of St. Anna of the 2nd degree (1893);
Order of St. Vladimir 3rd degree (1899).
Order of Saint Stanislaus (House of Romanov), 1st degree (1910)
Order of St. Anna 1st degree with swords (1915);
Order of St. Vladimir of the 2nd degree with swords (1915);
Order of the White Eagle with swords (1915).

Foreign
Cavalier cross of the French Order of the Legion of Honor (1897);
Commander's Cross of the Romanian Star Order (1899);
Commander's Cross of the Italian Order of St. Mauritius and Lazarus (1903).

Family ties
Brother: Nikolai (1862–1914) – Colonel, commander of the 4th Grenadier Nesvizh Regiment, participant in the First World War.

References

Sources
Volkov S.V. Generality of the Russian Empire. Encyclopedic dictionary of generals and admirals from Peter I to Nicholas II. Volume I. AK. M., 2009
The highest orders on the ranks of the military, 02.1915
List to the generals by seniority, 15 April 1914
List to the generals by seniority, 1 July 1909
List to the generals by seniority, 1 July 1906

External links
 ;
  Русская императорская армия;
  Павловское ВУ-преподавательский состав

Russian military personnel of the Russo-Turkish War (1877–1878)
Russian military personnel of World War I
Recipients of the Order of St. Anna, 1st class
Recipients of the Order of St. Anna, 2nd class
Recipients of the Order of St. Anna, 3rd class
Recipients of the Order of Saint Stanislaus (Russian), 1st class
Recipients of the Order of Saint Stanislaus (Russian), 2nd class
Recipients of the Order of Saint Stanislaus (Russian), 3rd class
1857 births
1916 deaths